Martin Broomall Biles (March 30, 1919 – August 25, 2017) was an American javelin thrower who competed in the 1948 Summer Olympics. He was born in San Diego, California.

Competing for Cal, Biles won the 1940 and 1941 NCAA Championships in the javelin, becoming the third two-time winner in the event. In 1942, his younger brother, Bob, won the NCAA title while also competing for Cal.

References

1919 births
2017 deaths
Track and field athletes from San Diego
Olympic track and field athletes of the United States
Athletes (track and field) at the 1948 Summer Olympics
American male javelin throwers